Qaleh-ye Amir (also Romanized as Qal‘eh-ye Amīr; also known as Qal‘eh Amīrīyeh, Qal‘eh-e Mīr, Qal‘eh Mīr, and Qal‘eh-ye Mīr) is a village in Golestan Rural District, in the Central District of Falavarjan County, Isfahan Province, Iran. At the 2006 census, its population was 1,592, in 419 families.

References 

Populated places in Falavarjan County